Giżewo  is a village in the administrative district of Gmina Kruszwica, within Inowrocław County, Kuyavian-Pomeranian Voivodeship, in north-central Poland.

Administrative Divisions 
Between 1975-1998, the town administratively belonged to Bydgoszcz Voivodeship.

Around 1560, the village belonged to Mrs. Słonecka and Krzysztof Markowski, and in more recent times to the Sokólski family. In 1816 the owner of Giżewo was Leon Górski.

References

Villages in Inowrocław County